Robert Van Kerkhoven (1 October 1924 – 18 June 2017) was a Belgian international footballer who played as a midfielder.

Career
Van Kerkhoven played club football for Daring Club Bruxelles.

He earned a total of nine caps for Belgium between 1951 and 1956, and participated at the 1954 FIFA World Cup. Van Kerkhoven died in June 2017 at the age of 92. His death wasn't reported until more than two years later.

References

1924 births
2017 deaths
1954 FIFA World Cup players
Association football midfielders
Belgian footballers
Belgium international footballers